Geoffrey Wasteneys is a Canadian biologist, currently at University of British Columbia and a Canada Research Chair in Plant Cell Biology.

References

Year of birth missing (living people)
Living people
Academic staff of the University of British Columbia
Canadian biologists